Acanthoibidion chevrolatii is a species of beetle in the family Cerambycidae, and the only species in the genus Acanthoibidion. It was described by White in 1855.

References

Eligmodermini
Beetles described in 1855